Mallet is a surname. Notable people with the surname include:

Alain Manesson Mallet (1630–1706), French cartographer and engineer
Alexandre Mallet (born 1992), Canadian ice hockey player
Anatole Mallet (1837–1919), Swiss mechanical engineer
Sir Bernard Mallet (1859–1932), British civil servant
Sir Charles Mallet (1862–1947), British historian and politician
David Mallet (writer) (c.1705–1765), Scottish dramatist and poet
David Mallet (director) (born 1945), British director
Demond Mallet (born 1978), American basketball player
Elizabeth Mallet (fl.1672–1706), British printer and bookseller
Ernest Mallet (1863–1956), French banker
Félicia Mallet (1863–1928), French comedian, singer and pantomime artist
Francis Mallet (died 1570), English churchman
Frederick Richard Mallet (1841-1921), Irish geologist who worked in India
Sir George Mallet (1923–2010), Saint Lucia politician
Grégory Mallet (born 1984), French swimmer
Sir Ivo Mallet (1900–1988), British ambassador
Jacques Mallet du Pan (1749–1800), French journalist
James Mallet (born 1955), British biologist
John Mallet (died 1570), MP for Bodmin
John Mallet (1832–1912), Irish chemist
Sir Louis Mallet (1823–1890), British civil servant
Sir Louis du Pan Mallet (1864–1936), British diplomat
Marie-Anne-Marcelle Mallet (1805–1871), Canadian nun, founder of the Sisters of Charity of Quebec
Maurice Mallet (1861–1926), French cofounder of Zodiac Aerospace
Nathalie Mallet, Canadian writer
Pardal Mallet (1864–1894), Brazilian journalist and novelist
Paul Henri Mallet (1730–1807), Genevan historian
Pierre Antoine and Paul Mallet, French travellers and explorers  
Robert Mallet (1810–1881), Irish geologist, civil engineer, and inventor
Tania Mallet (1941–2019), English model
Véronik Mallet (born 1994), Canadian figure skater
Vincent Mallet (born 1993), French rugby union player
Sir Victor Mallet (1893–1969), British diplomat

See also

 Mallet family, a French family of bankers and businessmen
 Mallett, a similar surname
 Malet, a similar surname

French-language surnames